The 2014 Indoor Football League season is the sixth season of the Indoor Football League (IFL). Playing with nine teams in two conferences spread across the United States, the league's regular season kicked off on February 21, 2014, when the reigning league champion Sioux Falls Storm played host to the Nebraska Danger. The regular season ended 17 weeks later on June 21, 2014, with the Nebraska Danger visiting the Texas Revolution.

Teams
For 2014, the IFL maintained its two-conference no-divisions format with each of 9 teams scheduled to play 14 games during the 17-week regular season. That was the same number of teams as played in the 2013 IFL season. The Minnesota-based Bemidji Axemen expansion team replaced the Chicago Slaughter which returned to the Continental Indoor Football League for the 2014 season.

United Conference

Intense Conference

Personnel
In mid-December 2013, Michael Allshouse moved up from assistant to commissioner of the IFL, replacing Robert Loving who is now the league's chief financial officer. For 2014, Mike McCoy serves as the Director of Business Development and Tom Falcinelli returns as the Director of Officiating.

Expansion
In January 2014, the league announced that the Billings Wolves would join the league for the 2015 season. The Wolves will play their home games at Rimrock Auto Arena at MetraPark in Billings, Montana. The city was previously home to the Billings Outlaws who folded after a tornado heavily damaged their home arena.

Standings

Playoffs

Awards

Individual season awards

1st Team All-IFL

2nd Team All-IFL

References